RX 100 is a 2018 Indian Telugu-language romantic action drama film written and directed by Ajay Bhupathi. The film stars Kartikeya Gummakonda and Payal Rajput with Rao Ramesh and Ramki playing the supporting roles.

In 2020, Ajay Bhupathi confirmed the sequel of the film.

Plot
Siva is a well-behaved man in Atreyapuram, Andhra Pradesh, who meets Indu, the daughter of a local politician Viswanatham and they fall for each other. One day, Indu tells Siva that her father is planning to get her married to the guy named Mahesh and she tells him that they should not meet until she convinces her father. 

Fearing that Vishwanatham wouldn't accept their love, Siva asks Daddy to convince Vishwanatham to get them married. On the way to Viswanatham's house, Daddy meets with an accident and has been admitted in the hospital. Viswanatham disapproves of their love and gets Indu married to Mahesh against her wishes and sends her to US. Siva is also thrashed by Vishwanatham's goons when he tried to stop Indu's wedding. Enraged about losing Indu, Siva develops aggressiveness and starts destroying Vishwanatham's business. Siva learns that Indu has returned from US and creates a ruckus twice in front of her house. 

Daddy tells Siva's friend that when he had gone to Vishwanatham's house, he had overheard the conversation between him and Indu. To his and Vishwanatham's shock, Indu confesses that she was in love with Mahesh. Vishwanatham accepts Indu's love thinking that Mahesh would be better than Siva. After Daddy leaves the place, he met with an accident. It is revealed that Indu is a very self-absorbed woman who uses people for her needs and is predatory in her actions. Even though Vishwanatham knows the truth about Indu and chastises her for it, he still continues to harm Siva for her own good. Vishwanatham sends his men to warn Siva not to see Indu until she and her husband Mahesh leave for US, but Indu bribes them to kill Siva. 

One of Viswanatham's men stabs and reveals about Indu to Siva, who confronts Indu and curses her that her life is on his mercy and she is going to live with guilt forever. After this, Siva dies leaving Daddy devastated.

Cast
 Kartikeya as Siva
 Payal Rajput as Indu 
 Rao Ramesh as Visvanaathham
 Ramki as Daddy
 Mahesh as Raju Bhai
 Lakshman Miisaala as Lakshman
 Giridhar

Production 
Ashok Reddy, in an interview to The Times of India, said that "Ajay brought us the story of this film during the release of Premato Mee Karthik. We were so impressed with the story because it is different, raw and native. Premato Mee Karthik is a family movie, so this was going to be a huge deviation. But we were confident about the story and Ajay both, so we began shooting in December last year. During the shooting too, the technicians working on the film liked the way the film was shaping up. That's where the positive buzz began."

Soundtrack 
The songs were composed by Chaitan Bharadwaj and Smaran. The song "Pillaa Raa" became one of the biggest hits of Telugu. It is sung by Anurag Kulkarni and composed by Chaitan Bharadwaj.

Reception

Box office 
It became one of the few A-rated films in Tollywood with huge success at the box office.

Critical reception 
Baradwaj Rangan of Film Companion South called it "a generic angry young man's generic love story, until a solid twist turns everything on its head". Suhas Yellapantula of The Times of India stated "Take away the blood and gore and there's a story here. RX 100 touches a rather unexplored subject but falters in its execution. You can't help but wonder why the director plays around with so many different camera angles and tries to create a dark setting. RX 100 has sex, tears and a lot of blood, but the essence of the film is somewhere lost in between. Just like that RX 100 bike which is in focus all the time, but in reality, is insignificant."

Srivathsan Nadadhur of The Hindu wrote about the film that "Director Ajay Bhupathi's raw storytelling is a plus for RX 100, the narrative borders on voyeurism at times, but the filmmaker displays enough maturity to not make it seem crass. His inexperience still shows, though, too many moments of nothingness, an indulgent screenplay goes overboard in exploring the angst of the male protagonist. The second hour is inconsistent, the intensity of a full-blown action-romance is amiss despite potent writing. The lead protagonist Karthikeya gets a dream role, yet it's too big a shoe to fill in his debut."

Awards and nominations

Remake and sequel
The film was planned to be remade in Tamil with Aadhi Pinisetty but the film never entered production.

The film was remade in Odia as Premo Na Pagalopana. A film, announced to be remade in Hindi starring Tara Sutaria and debutant Ahan Shetty in March 2019, began filming on 6 August with title as Tadap. Produced by Sajid Nadiadwala, directed by Milan Luthria and presented by Fox Star Studios, it released theatrically on 3 December 2021.

Another film, which is touted to be a remake, is the Kannada film Shiva 143, starring Dheeran Ramkumar and Manvita Kamath in the lead roles was released on 26th August 2022 in theatres. It is produced by Jayanna and Bhogendhra, directed by Anil Kumar. In 2020, Ajay Bhupathi confirmed the sequel of the film.

References

External links 
 
 

2010s Telugu-language films
2018 films
Indian independent films
Films about depression
Indian romantic action films
Telugu films remade in other languages
Indian romantic drama films
2018 action drama films
2018 masala films
2010s romantic action films
2018 romantic drama films
Films shot in Rajahmundry
Films shot in Andhra Pradesh
Films set in Andhra Pradesh
Films set in Rajahmundry
Films set in Konaseema